The Mass is an album released in 2003 by Eric Lévi's musical project Era. It is Era's third album. It achieved success in several European countries. The title track, "The Mass", is an adaptation of O Fortuna, a classical piece by Carl Orff.

Videos were shot for "The Mass" and "Looking for Something" on location at Chateau de Commarque, France; featuring actors Pierre Boisserie and Irene Bustamante.

Track listings

Charts

Weekly charts

Year-end charts

Certifications

References 

Era (musical project) albums
2003 albums